The Key West Cubs were a Class A minor league baseball affiliate of the Chicago Cubs in 1975.  The team played its home games at Wickers Stadium in Key West, Florida. Prior to being named the Cubs, the team was known as the Key West Conchs from 1972-1974, and the year before that, they were called the Key West Sun Caps. However the team was founded in 1969 as the Key West Padres.

History

Padres
The 1969 season was the first in the Major League history of the San Diego Padres franchise.  Prior to the 1969 Padres, Key West had not played host to a professional team since 1952 when the Key West Conchs of the Florida International League played a partial season at Wickers Stadium.  The team would enjoy a successful first season with a 66-64 record, which was good enough for a third-place finish in the Southern Division of the FSL. The 1969 Key West Padres were managed by legendary future Major League manager, Don Zimmer.

At the end of the season Padres management would fold the team and move much of their minor league operations to the west coast.  The City of Key West would not have a team in the 1970 season, however, in 1971 a new team, the Key West Sun Caps would emerge.

Sun Caps
After not hosting baseball in 1970, the Sun Caps were established.  The Sun Caps would not be affiliated with one Major League Club but would rather be known as a Co-Op team, made up of a few players from a number of organizations.  The Sun Caps were typically cast-off players and most of the time when a player showed promise he was moved to a different team.  They were the only team in the 12 team league that was not affiliated with just one big-league club.  As such the Sun Caps suffered through a 45-93 record which placed them dead last in the FSL.

Conchs
After the 1971 season the Sun Caps would still remain a co-op team, but were renamed the Key West Conchs.  The Conchs became affiliated with the Chicago Cubs for the 1974 season, but posted their worst record yet that season: 37 wins - 94 losses.

Cubs
The next year, 1975, the team was renamed for their Major League affiliate, becoming the Key West Cubs for their final season in Key West. The team would enjoy a successful season with a 65-69 record, which was good enough for a second-place finish in the Southern Division of the FSL.  The Cubs would lose in the first round of the playoffs.

At the end of the season Cubs management would move the team to Pompano Beach, Florida and rename them the Pompano Beach Cubs.  The 1975 Key West Cubs would be the last professional team, to date, to be based in Key West.

Notable alumni
Baseball Hall of Fame Alumni

 Bruce Sutter (1974) Inducted, 2006

Notable Alumni

 Nino Espinosa (1971)

 Mike Krukow (1974) MLB All-Star

 Donnie Moore (1974) MLB All-Star

 Bob Lacey (1973)

 Dennis Lamp (1974)  MLB All-Star

 Don Zimmer (1969, MGR) 2 x MLB All-Star; 1989 NL Manager of the Year

References

Defunct Florida State League teams
Defunct minor league baseball teams
Chicago Cubs minor league affiliates
San Diego Padres minor league affiliates
Baseball teams established in 1969
Baseball teams disestablished in 1975
Defunct baseball teams in Florida
1969 establishments in Florida
1975 disestablishments in Florida